Symere Bysil Woods (born July 31, 1995), known professionally as Lil Uzi Vert, is an American rapper, singer, and songwriter. They are characterized by their facial tattoos, facial piercings, eccentric hairstyles and androgynous fashion, imagery built on a melodic approach to trap. Born and raised in Philadelphia, Lil Uzi Vert gained initial recognition following the release of the commercial mixtape Luv Is Rage (2015), which led to a recording contract with Atlantic Records, to whom they signed under DJ Drama's Generation Now imprint.

Lil Uzi Vert attracted mainstream attention following the release of their debut single "Money Longer" in 2016. The song would act as the lead single for the subsequent mixtape Lil Uzi Vert vs. the World (2016), which also contained the song "You Was Right". After releasing two additional mixtapes in 2016 and 2017, including one in collaboration with Gucci Mane, Lil Uzi Vert was featured on the Billboard Hot 100 chart-topping Migos' single "Bad and Boujee". They later secured their first top ten single with "XO Tour Llif3", which won the MTV Video Music Award for Song of Summer.

"XO Tour Llif3" acted as the lead single to Lil Uzi Vert's debut studio album Luv Is Rage 2 (2017), which debuted at number one on the Billboard 200, and was certified double platinum by the Recording Industry Association of America (RIAA). At the 2018 Grammy Awards, Lil Uzi Vert was nominated for Best New Artist. Their second studio album, Eternal Atake (2020), was among the most anticipated albums in contemporary trap and rap when it was finally released following years' worth of delays. Eternal Atake, like Luv Is Rage 2, debuted at number one on the Billboard 200.

Early life 
Symere Woods was born July 31, 1995, in North Philadelphia's Francisville neighborhood. They grew up listening to Mike Jones and Ying Yang Twins; Jones' debut album was the first album they purchased. Woods later began listening to Wiz Khalifa and Meek Mill, who influenced their future style. They also began listening to Marilyn Manson, Paramore, Smash Mouth, The Rocket Summer, Simian, My Chemical Romance, and The All-American Rejects when they were 13 years old, and have said they are a "big Marilyn Manson fan" and called Mechanical Animals their favorite album.

Woods began rapping in tenth grade, calling themself a "regular kid, I didn't really wanna rap", after hearing classmate William Aston freestyle over a remade Chris Brown instrumental. Woods, Aston and another friend created a rap group, Steaktown, which broke up when Woods was 17.

Woods dropped out of school and soon started working at a Bottom Dollar store, but they quit after four days and were kicked out of their home by their mother. The situation led to Woods getting their first face tattoo, the word "Faith" under their hairline, which provoked them to take their rap career seriously.

In July 2021, Woods revealed on a tweet that their birth certificate shows they were born in 1995, after erroneously believing they were born one year earlier.

Career

2010–2015: Career beginnings
Woods began to rap in 2010 and began to associate with musical groups like Steaktown and in what they say was "just for money" under the name "Sealab Vertical". They later changed their name to Lil Uzi Vert from the way someone described their rap flow, saying their flow was "Fast, like a machine gun." Woods' first project, an EP titled Purple Thoughtz Vol. 1 was released on January 19, 2014. The project, which was described as "phonk" and having cloud rap beats from The Guardian due to its psychedelic and "trippy" production features Woods with a bigger focus on lyricism than most of their career and was released with the single "White Shit" which included a video. The track, which was produced by Spaceghostpurrp, went viral in 2017 within hip-hop circles following Wood's entry into the mainstream. Shortly after the release of Purple Thoughtz Vol. 1, Woods caught the attention of then industry-mainstays like the ASAP Mob.

The project and following features caught the attention of producer and Def Jam A&R Don Cannon after DJ Diamond Kuts played one of Woods' songs on a local radio station, who signed Woods to their The Academy imprint and produced their first mixtape, The Real Uzi which was released on August 5, 2014. After the release of The Real Uzi, Woods signed a record deal with Atlantic Records through DJ Drama, Don Cannon's and Leighton Morrison's imprint, Generation Now.

Following their signing to Atlantic Records, Woods was featured alongside Rich the Kid and ASAP Ferg on Carnage's single "WDYW". They also released several songs on SoundCloud including the Metro Boomin produced "No Wait", "Pressure" which is a collaboration with Lil Durk and "Dej Loaf". They were featured on Fall Out Boy and Wiz Khalifa's "Boys of Zummer" tour in August 2015. Woods released their second mixtape, Luv Is Rage on October 30, 2015. The project, which features production from then-bubbling producers such as Sonny Digital, TM88 and Maaly Raw with features from Billboard charting rappers such as Wiz Khalifa and Young Thug, was received positively and was featured on numerous music blogs such as Fader, XXL and Vibe. They were further called a "breakout artist of 2015" by HotNewHipHop.

2016: Breakthrough

In January 2016, Lil Uzi appeared at an A$AP Mob show in New York City to honor the deceased ASAP Yams. In February, they released the single, "Money Longer" on their SoundCloud following a radio debut on Shade 45. Controversy arose in March 2016 after a riot broke out at SXSW's final day during Woods set. On April 15, 2016, Uzi released their third mixtape and first commercial mixtape Lil Uzi Vert vs. the World. The mixtape debuted at number 37 on the Billboard 200 chart, making its Woods first entry on the chart.  The project spent 55 weeks on the Billboard 200 album chart, eventually being certified Gold. Woods and Kodak Black embarked on a joint tour in May 2016, titled the "Parental Advisory" tour.

In June 2016, Lil Uzi Vert appeared in XXL magazine as part of their 2016 Freshman Class. As part of this appearance, Uzi performed a 'freshman cypher' alongside Denzel Curry, Lil Yachty, 21 Savage, and Kodak Black. As of December 2021, this cypher has received over 195 million YouTube views, by far the most for the XXL channel. Riding the wave of recognition the XXL Freshman list gave them, Woods released the video for the single "Money Longer" which debuted on the Billboard Hot 100 the following week, their first entry on the chart, at number 92 on July 2, 2016. The song later peaked at number 54 and is currently certified two-times platinum in the United States. Woods second entry on the chart, Metro Boomin produced "You Was Right" debuted at 89 on July 30, 2016, and peaked at number 40.

On July 12, 2016, Woods announced their fourth mixtape, The Perfect LUV Tape, which was released on July 31, their 22nd birthday. The mixtape featured the singles "Seven Million", featuring Future, and "Erase Your Social", both of which failed to chart on the Billboard Hot 100. The mixtape debuted at number 55 on the Billboard 200 album chart and is certified Gold by the RIAA. In October 2016, Woods was announced to be an additional artist on Canadian singer the Weeknd's tour.

Woods announced a collaboration mixtape with Gucci Mane which was released on November 23, 2016. On the 27th, Woods announced Luv Is Rage 2 which eventually went through a series of delays.

2017: Luv Is Rage 2 

Uzi featured on the hip-hop trio Migos' single "Bad and Boujee". The single was released on October 28, 2016, and is from the trio's second studio album, Culture (2017). In January 2017, around the time the album released, the single peaked atop the US Billboard Hot 100, becoming Uzi's first number 1 single as a lead or featured artist, and their highest-charting single as both. On February 27, 2017, Woods released the EP Luv Is Rage 1.5 while on tour with the Weeknd. The EP was positively received for its "nerdy" nature with Kingdom Hearts themed instrumentals and lyrics referring to anime, Steven Universe and hentai. The EP was also credited as the start of Woods' affiliation with the "emo rapper" label due to the heartbreak-associated lyrics on the song "Luv Scars K.o 1600" and references to threats of suicide and depression on the stand-out track "XO Tour Llif3".

"XO Tour Llif3"'s significant popularity on SoundCloud resulted in Woods playing it live on the European leg of the Weeknd's tour and the following week the song was added to streaming services and released as an official single. On April 4, 2017, "Xo Tour Llif3" debuted on Billboard Hot 100 at number 49 and peaked at number seven, becoming the rapper's highest-charting song and biggest song, being certified six-times platinum as of August 2018.

Luv Is Rage 2 was delayed again on April 2, 2017, with Woods blaming it on DJ Drama. On April 9, Don Cannon confirmed the project would not be released "any time soon" and confirmed that "XO Tour Llif3" would appear on the album. Uzi was featured on fellow rapper Playboi Carti's single "Woke Up Like This". It was released on April 7, 2017, and is from Carti's debut commercial mixtape, Playboi Carti (2017). The single was performed by the pair at Coachella 2017.

"Woke Up Like This" was eventually certified platinum and peaked at number 76 on the Billboard Hot 100. Uzi was featured alongside ASAP Rocky, Playboi Carti, Quavo and Frank Ocean on ASAP rappers collective ASAP Mob's single "Raf". The single was released by surprise on May 15, 2017, and is from the collective's second studio album, Cozy Tapes Vol. 2: Too Cozy.
In early August, hip-hop media personality DJ Akademiks claimed that Luv Is Rage 2 would release within 30 days. On August 24, 2017, Luv Is Rage 2 was announced for a surprise release at midnight and on August 25, 2017, Lil Uzi Vert released their heavily delayed debut studio album, Luv Is Rage 2, which included top ten single, "XO TOUR Llif3" as the lead single.

The album debuted at number one on the Billboard 200 albums chart, with 135,000 album-equivalent units and has since been certified platinum. The album also created ten Billboard Hot 100 charting singles, with two, "The Way Life Goes", featuring Oh Wonder, and "Sauce It Up" becoming singles. During British singer Ed Sheeran's set at the Video Music Awards, Woods and Sheeran performed a medley of "XO Tour Llif3" and Sheeran's chart-topping single, "Shape Of You".

In September 2017, Woods teased a possible sequel project to Lil Uzi Vert vs The World possibly titled Lil Uzi Vert vs. The World 2 and a collaboration project with Playboi Carti titled 16*29. In October, a joint-tour with Playboi Carti called the "16*29 tour" was announced further promoting the possibility of a collaboration project. The tour was cancelled shortly thereafter due to Woods claiming they needed to "focus". In October 2017, Woods headlined Power 105.1's annual Powerhouse music celebration, alongside the Weeknd, Migos, and Cardi B, at the Barclays Center in Brooklyn, New York. Woods was also featured on Canadian rapper Nav's platinum-certified single "Wanted You". The song was released on November 3, 2017, Nav's 28th birthday, and is from Nav's debut studio album, Reckless (2018).

On December 4, 2017, "The Way Life Goes" music video was released with a remix, featuring Trinidadian-American rapper Nicki Minaj. The song subsequently peaked at number 24 on the Billboard Hot 100. Woods performed on Stephen Colbert's The Late Show performing "The Way Life Goes" on February 6, 2018 Uzi was featured alongside Kanye West on Travis Scott's song, "Watch", which was released on May 3, 2018. "Watch" debuted at number 16 on the Billboard Hot 100 chart. They were also featured on a remix for fellow rapper Lil Tracy's single "Like a Farmer".

2018–2020: Eternal Atake, Lil Uzi Vert vs. The World 2, and Pluto x Baby Pluto
In January 2018, Uzi announced that they had completed a mixtape with record producer Wheezy. In May 2018, Don Cannon confirmed that a new Uzi project was dropping in 2018 and speculation arose in July 2018 when Woods tweeted the words "Eternal Atake", their second studio album (2020), pinning the tweet and announcing it was "coming soon" and then at the end of the month sharing the then-chosen cover art for the project. The then-chosen cover art for Eternal Atake references the logo of the cult Heaven's Gate. The two members who survived the cult suggested that legal actions could be taken against Uzi for copying the logo style.

The art was the source of a threat from the two remaining members of the organization over legal attack. The then-thought lead single from Eternal Atake, "New Patek" was released on September 18, 2018. Uzi was then featured on Lil Pump's single, "Multi Millionaire". The single was released on October 5, 2018, and is from Pump's second studio album, Harverd Dropout.

In April 2019, following label trouble with Generation Now, it was announced that Uzi was now signed to Roc Nation. Two new promotional singles were released in April 2019, titled "Sanguine Paradise" and "That's a Rack", originally thought to be from their highly anticipated studio album, Eternal Atake.

On December 13, 2019, Uzi released a new single titled, "Futsal Shuffle 2020", which is the lead single of Eternal Atake. They then released the second single of the album, titled "That Way", on March 1, 2020. Eternal Atake was released on March 6, 2020, with a sole guest appearance from American singer Syd. The release date of the album was a week earlier then fans expected it to release. "New Patek", "That's a Rack" and "Sanguine Paradise" did not appear on the album. Eternal Atake debuted atop the Billboard 200.

On March 12, 2020, Lil Uzi teased that the deluxe version of Eternal Atake and the sequel to their July 2016 mixtape, Lil Uzi Vert vs. the World, titled Lil Uzi Vert vs. the World 2, would release the following day, the date fans expected the release date of the original album. The deluxe edition would have fourteen new tracks, featuring guest appearances from Chief Keef, 21 Savage, Future, Young Thug, Gunna, Lil Durk, Young Nudy and Nav.  The first half of the album maintained a leading number 1 position (equal to 288,000 album sales in the United States) with 400 million streams in early 2020, during the COVID-19 pandemic. This marked the largest streaming count for any album since 2018 when Lil Wayne's twelfth studio album, Tha Carter V, got 433 million streams.

On April 24, 2020, Lil Uzi Vert released a new single titled "Sasuke", the first since the release of the deluxe version of Eternal Atake. On July 10, 2020, Lil Uzi appeared on the remix of StaySolidRocky's "Party Girl". On July 21, 2020, Lil Uzi and Future hinted at an upcoming joint project titled Pluto x Baby Pluto on their social media. The two later released two new singles, "Patek" and "Over Your Head", on July 31, which was Uzi's 26th birthday. Pluto x Baby Pluto was released on November 13, 2020, and peaked at number two on the Billboard 200. A deluxe version containing the two previously released singles as well as 6 new tracks was released 4 days later on November 17.

2021–present: The Pink Tape 

In late 2020, Lil Uzi Vert began promoting new singles on Instagram live that were sonically similar to popular releases early in their career. They subsequently announced an upcoming project titled Forever Young, as well as a follow-up to Luv Is Rage 2 and a project to be released exclusively on SoundCloud. On October 29, 2021, Lil Uzi Vert released the single "Demon High", Awhich is expected to be the lead single to their upcoming album The Pink Tape, which they have been teasing to their fans since December 2020. In April 2022, Woods had two guest appearances on the deluxe edition of American rapper Yeat's 2 Alive album, appearing as the featured on the songs "Big Tonka" and "3G". 

On July 12, 2022, Uzi announced an EP titled Red & White, which was meant to be released prior to The Pink Tape. The EP was released ten days later, with Uzi releasing a number of highly anticipated tracks exclusively on SoundCloud in the lead-up to its release. In September 2022, Uzi again collaborated with Yeat, appearing as a featured artist on Yeat's September 2022 EP Lyfe, featuring on the EP's opening track "Flawless". In October 2022, they released their single "Just Wanna Rock", which had gone viral on the video-sharing app TikTok. "Just Wanna Rock", a Jersey Club-inspired song with production from Synthetic and rising Jersey Club producer McVertt, peaked at number 10 on the Billboard Hot 100, their highest charting single since the rollout of Eternal Atake.

Musical style
Complex called Uzi "one of those names to pay attention to in 2016", and Spin wrote "the 22-year-old has solidified [their] spot as one to watch" with their "signature rapid delivery." Noisey called them "articularly charismatic", a "natural entertainer" who is "for better or for worse, yanking people into the future."

Lil Uzi Vert's style of rap has been compared to rock music, as well as being labeled with the terms emo rap and punk rap. They have also been described as a lo-fi rapper and compared to rapper Lil Wayne.

Influences
Lil Uzi Vert calls Marilyn Manson their "greatest inspiration". They are also a fan of the band Paramore, specifically citing frontwoman Hayley Williams as an influence. In an interview with Complex, Lil Uzi Vert cited ASAP Rocky (for whom they featured on "Raf"), Pharrell Williams (with whom they collaborated on "Neon Guts"), Kanye West (with whom they featured on "Watch"), Simple Plan, Young Thug (with whom they collaborated on "Yamborghini Dream", "What's The Move", and "Strawberry Peels"), Wiz Khalifa (with whom they collaborated on "Queso" and "Pull Up"), Lil Wayne (for whom they featured on "Multiple Flows"), and the Ying Yang Twins as influences.

Personal life 
Woods was in a relationship with fashion designer Brittany Byrd from 2014 to 2017. Byrd moved from California to attend the Parsons School of Design, where she was studying when she met Woods. Woods first referenced Byrd in their song "Nuyork Nights at 21" from Luv Is Rage and later made multiple other songs about her. A popular figure among Woods' fans, she also appeared in the music video for Woods' breakout single "Money Longer". On June 26, 2017, Woods and Byrd broke up, which Woods announced with a song titled "Stole Your Luv". Since 2019, Woods has been in a relationship with JT of the hip hop duo City Girls.

In an interview with GQ, Woods stated that they are allergic to chocolate.

Following the death of rapper Lil Peep from an accidental fentanyl overdose, Woods announced they were quitting drugs and attempting sobriety.

After the 2018 murder of Woods's friend, fellow musician XXXTentacion, Woods asked for help on social media from other rappers, to build a foundation against gun violence, which would keep XXXTentacion's family and his future child provided for.

In July 2022, Woods changed their pronouns to they/them on Instagram, which was later confirmed by their spokesperson in a statement to Pitchfork.

Forehead diamond 
In February 2021, Woods revealed that they had a 10-carat pink diamond implanted in their forehead, which they had planned to do since 2017. They acquired the diamond, whose value was reported as $24 million, from jeweler Elliot Eliantte. Woods stated that the decision was influenced by the cartoon Steven Universe, of which they are openly a fan, and by fellow rapper Lil B, who has a similar implant. Woods said that they "could die" if their diamond is not removed "the right way". In June of the same year, they had the diamond removed from their forehead. They had it reimplanted for their performance at Rolling Loud the following month and revealed in September that fans ripped it out while Woods was crowd surfing at that event. They did not suffer serious damage and said that they still have the diamond. They have since replaced it with a barbell piercing.

The implant spawned several Internet memes comparing Woods' new appearance to that of Vision in the Marvel Cinematic Universe and often referring to the character's death in the film Avengers: Infinity War.

Satanism
Woods has been accused of being a Satanist, originally by battle rapper Daylyt who claimed that Woods worshipped Satan. Woods has been said to be inspired by Marilyn Manson's worship and support of Satan, who they called their biggest inspiration. In July 2018, Woods told a crowd of fans that they were "going to hell" with them.

In August 2017, Woods created controversy by adding satanic imagery to their social media accounts and saying phrases often associated with Satanism such as "666". Woods frequently promotes Satanism on their social media, which went far enough to warrant their Instagram access being taken from them by their record label.

Feuds 
Woods has had a long-standing stand-still with Generation Now imprint owners Don Cannon and DJ Drama over their music. Woods has insulted Don Cannon and DJ Drama over the delays to their Luv Is Rage 2 album, advised people against signing with Generation Now and referred to DJ Drama as an "old person".

On April 29, 2016, Atlanta rapper OG Maco went on a rant on social media where they claim that they "paved the way" for Woods and that Woods was "stealing their sauce", referring to their style. Maco implied there was no issue between Woods and them though Woods took offense to Maco's comment who mentioned Atlanta rapper Reese LaFlare who Woods was feuding with. In August 2016, Woods attempted to assault Reese LaFlare at Day N Night Fest after seeing them through a security barrier, though they were stopped by security. In September 2016, OG Maco and Woods resolved their feud. In January 2018, Woods punched Reese LaFlare in the face and bragged about it on social media, later deleting the tweet.

In early 2018, Woods had tweeted about how they were unhappy at DJ Drama's label, Generation Now. In response, fellow rapper Rich the Kid had replied saying that had Woods signed to their label, Rich Forever Music, they would have never had that problem. Woods responded by saying "Boy I'm not signing for 20racks [$20,000]." Rich then replied that it would have been worth accepting the offer either way. Soon enough, things escalated with disses on Instagram and Twitter between the two. In March 2018, Rich the Kid released a diss track on Woods, titled "Dead Friends", a play on words of Woods's catchphrase in their hit single, "XO Tour Llif3". This would then be followed up by Woods track "Rich Forever". It would never see an official release, however. An incident occurred in June 2018 at a Starbucks between Rich the Kid and Lil Uzi Vert, who attempted to attack Rich the Kid but was stopped by security.

Legal issues

2016–2020 arrests 
On December 8, 2016, Woods was arrested in Atlanta, Georgia for recklessly driving a dirtbike. Woods and a friend were driving a dirtbike without lights and helmets before being noticed by police. While being chased by the police, Woods fell off their dirtbike and attempted to run away on foot before being caught and held on $6,500 bond. In November 2017, the charge was resolved with Woods receiving a community service sentence. In October 2020, Woods and several others were arrested in the streets of Philadelphia after being involved in a paintball gun fight. They were caught after sharing a video of the dispute on Instagram.

2021 assault charges 
On July 2, 2021, Woods and Saint Jhn got into a confrontation after Saint Jhn was spotted by Woods with their ex-girlfriend Brittany Byrd. The confrontation led to a physical altercation between the two which resulted in Woods flashing a gun at the two, then holding the gun to their ex-girlfriend's stomach. It was reported that no one was harmed and everybody left the scene.

On July 6, 2021, XXL reported that Woods allegedly hospitalized Byrd by punching her in the face multiple times and put a gun to her stomach. Woods and their team did not respond to the claims made by Byrd.

On February 2, 2022, TMZ reported that Woods pleaded no contest in court to one count each of felony assault with a firearm and misdemeanor injury. They later accepted a plea deal for a sentence of three years of formal probation, one year of treatment for mental health and substance abuse, 52 weeks of domestic violence counseling, restitution and a 10-year criminal protective order.

Discography

Studio albums
 Luv Is Rage 2 (2017)
 Eternal Atake (2020)

Awards and nominations

See also

 List of highest-certified music artists in the United States
 List of hip hop musicians
 Music of Philadelphia

References

 
1995 births
Living people
21st-century African-American singers
21st-century American rappers
African-American rappers
African-American singer-songwriters
Age controversies
American dance musicians
American hip hop singers
American Satanists
Atlantic Records artists
Emo rap musicians
Mumble rappers
Non-binary musicians
Pop rappers
Rappers from Philadelphia
Roc Nation artists
Singer-songwriters from Pennsylvania
Trap musicians